British Social Hygiene Council (BSHC, until 1925 the National Council for Combating Venereal Diseases, NCCVD) was a British organization dedicated to eradicating venereal diseases and educating the public about them. It has been founded in 1914.

See also 
 Social hygiene movement

References 

1914 establishments in the United Kingdom
Sexually transmitted diseases and infections
Medical and health organisations based in the United Kingdom
Infectious disease organizations
1914 in health